Kanalichhina is a development block in Pithoragarh district of Uttarakhand state of India. It consists of 203 villages with a total 1994 population of 42,174. The geographical latitude of this place is 29°40'33"N and the longitude is 80°16'20"E.  Kanalichhina is so named after 'Chhin' in Kumauni means an open deep space between two hillocks characterized by windy terrain and valley on the other side.  It is situated on Pithoragarh-Dharchula state Highway, maintained by Indian Army's Border Road Organization wing.  Kanalachhina is situated at the mouth of the valley, once trade centre of yesteryears for local through ponies.  Dwaj, the abode of goddess 'Jayanti' is situated in front of it on a high mountain.  It is the place gateway to Eastern Himalayas.  Panchchuli is well visible from here.  Mt.Appi and Annapurna of Nepal are visible from here.  It is a Sub Tehsil Headquarters.

References

Hill stations in Uttarakhand
Cities and towns in Pithoragarh district